Waga North Grama Niladhari Division is a Grama Niladhari Division of the Padukka Divisional Secretariat of Colombo District of Western Province, Sri Lanka. It has Grama Niladhari Division Code 457B.

Waga North is a surrounded by the Pelpola, Pinnawala South, Waga East, Waga West and Elamalawala Grama Niladhari Divisions.

Demographics

Ethnicity 
The Waga North Grama Niladhari Division has a Sinhalese majority (100.0%). In comparison, the Padukka Divisional Secretariat (which contains the Waga North Grama Niladhari Division) has a Sinhalese majority (95.8%)

Religion 
The Waga North Grama Niladhari Division has a Buddhist majority (98.9%). In comparison, the Padukka Divisional Secretariat (which contains the Waga North Grama Niladhari Division) has a Buddhist majority (94.6%)

References 

Grama Niladhari Divisions of Padukka Divisional Secretariat